Seyyed Mahalleh-ye Shirabad (also Romanized as Seyyed Maḩalleh-ye Shīrābād; also known as Khvājeh Karī, Seyyed Lar Maḩalleh, and Seyyed Maḩalleh) is a village in Haviq Rural District, Haviq District, Talesh County, Gilan Province, Iran. At the 2006 census, its population was 534, in 137 families.

References 

Populated places in Talesh County